Raymond Joseph Mugerwa  (born June 4, 1988), better known by his stage name Ray Signature aka Uncle Ray, is a Ugandan singer-songwriter and music producer from Kampala, Uganda. Ray Signature has written and produced songs for several prominent artists in East Africa, including Irene Ntale, Rema Namakula, Juliana Kanyomozi, Fille, Allan Toniks among others. Signature also produces music for campaigns like Reach A Hand Uganda.

Life and career 
Ray Signature born Raymond Joseph Mugerwa was born on June 4, 1988.
Ray Signature's dad is a retired pastor so he grew up in a religious family, of eight children with Ray as the third born.
He studied from Buddo Junior School for Primary level, Seroma Christian High School, and Progressive Secondary School for O'Level and later the prestigious Kings College Buddo for his A-Level.
He went ahead and enrolled for a degree in Fine Art from Michelangelo School of Creative Arts.
He started his music career in 2008 under the group Big Tyme that was mentored and managed by Syliver Kyagulanyi at Sikia records.
Bigtyme was composed of Ray Signature commonly known as Uncle Ray, Lary Chary and Oscar a.k.a. Scar. They released songs like Apple, Sophia alongside Rabadaba and Miss. Uganda alongside Tanzanian rapper Kalla Jeremiah among others.

Solo Career (2011–present)

The group broke up in 2011 and Ray went ahead to pursue a solo career, releasing his first song, Kasenyaku, that made it to various radio and TV countdowns in the East African region.
The song gained both positive and negative criticism, with critics saying it's copied from Me and You by Nigerian duo Brackets.
He went ahead to release more music as a solo artist as well as songwriting for various artists.
He has done collaborations with some of the top artists in Uganda, with his songs making it to various countdowns.
He has collaborated with African music stars as well on songs like Never let her go featuring Roberto from Zambia of the Amarula hit single, Katambala with Irene Ntale among others.
He has shared a stage with some of Africa's finest artists like General Ozzy, Roberto, Too 4 Real, Nyanda  among others.

In June 2018, Ray signed with Storm Interactive.

Recently, Ray Signature is signed under an ultrasound record label known as NileOne Academy where he has been able to record his first love single, Mon Amie his EP Made in June.

Philanthropy
Reach A Hand Uganda (RAHU)

Discography
Kasenyanku
Naloba featuring Mun G
Ebigambo
Sikuta
Who you are featuring Allan Toniks
Katambala featuring Irene Ntale
Gwe Asinga featuring Fille
Never let her go featuring Roberto from Zambia
Private Party featuring Two for Real from Rwanda
Towakana alongside Ziza Bafana
Nabosa
Mon AMie featuring Naava Grey

Studio albums

Ultimate Rebirth (2018) 
 Birala
 Too Bad ft Deejay Pius
 Don't Break My Heart
 All the best
 Where Are You
 Koona

Songs Written by Ray Signature
Gyobera by Irene Ntale
Olindaba by Irene Ntale
Nzena Nzena by Irene Ntale
Gwe Aliko by Irene Ntale
Sitaki by Rema Namakula
Nseya Nseya by Juliana Kanyomozi
Deep in love by Rema Namakula
Guno Omukwano by Lydia Jazmine
Double trouble by Fille
Wandisaki by Rema Namakula
Like I do by Baninas

Personal life
In December 2015, Ray Signature was involved in a near fatal accident, in Kamwokya.

External links

References

1986 births
Living people
21st-century Ugandan male singers
People from Kampala